Asociación Hebraica y Macabi del Uruguay, commonly known as Hebraica Macabi, is a professional basketball team based in Montevideo. The club currently plays in the Liga Uruguaya de Basketball, the top tier basketball league of Uruguay. Founded in 1944, it participated in most Uruguayan basketball tournaments. During the first cycle, the name used by the club was Macabi Hacoaj, later changing its name to the current one.

History
Macabi was promoted to the Second Division of Uruguay Basketball in 1972 and to the First Division in 1973, winning three federal tournaments (Uruguay's most important tournament until 2000). The team retired from Uruguayan basketball in 1997, but then returned in 2004 to the Third Division. Obtaining two promotions over three years, Hebraica y Macabi played in 2007–08 on the Liga Uruguaya de Basketball, Uruguay's most important tournament, obtaining second place.

Macabi won its first national championship during the 2011–12 edition of the Liga Uruguaya de Basketball.

Honours
Liga Uruguaya de Basketball
Winners (3): 2011–12, 2015–16, 2016–17

Liga Metropolitana
Winners (1): 2006

Current roster

References

External links
 Official website

Basketball teams in Uruguay
Basketball teams in Montevideo
Basketball teams established in 1939
1939 establishments in Uruguay
Maccabi basketball clubs